"God morgon" is a song written by Uno Svenningsson and Staffan Hellstrand, and performed by Uno Svenningsson and Irma Schultz Keller at Melodifestivalen 2007. The song participated in the semifinal in the town of Jönköping on 3 February 2007, from where it reached Andra chansen. Once there the song failed to reach the final inside the Stockholm Globe Arena. The song's lyrics describes morning arriving in a town. On 5 March 2007, the single for the song was released, peaking at number 18 on the Swedish Singles Chart.

The song entered Svensktoppen on 15 April 2007, reaching the 7th position. The upcoming week, it had fallen to the 9th position, before getting knocked out the upcoming week.

During Melodifestivalen 2012 the song was one of the "Tredje chansen" numbers.

Single track listing
God morgon
God morgon (karaoke version)

Charts

References

External links
Information at Svensk mediedatabas

2007 singles
Melodifestivalen songs of 2007
Swedish-language songs
Songs written by Staffan Hellstrand
Songs written by Uno Svenningsson
2007 songs
Uno Svenningsson songs
Irma Schultz Keller songs